Triton Submarines is a Florida-based company that designs and manufactures private submersibles for research, filming, deep-ocean exploration, and the luxury yachting and tourism sector. It was founded in 2007.

History
In 2017, Triton announced an ultra-luxury submersible in collaboration with Aston Martin called Project Neptune. Utilizing the Triton 1650/3 Low Profile submersible as its certified platform, and sharing design language with the Aston Martin Valkyrie hyper-car, the Project Neptune submersible features an exclusive interior, improved hydrodynamics, and extra powerful thrusters for increased speed and maneuverability.

As of 2019, DSV Limiting Factor, a Triton 36000/2 Full Ocean Depth (FOD) model operated by Victor Vescovo, holds the record for deepest crewed descent (to the revised depth of  ±, in the Challenger Deep).
Between 28 April and 4 May 2019 the DSV Limiting Factor completed four crewed dives to the bottom of Challenger Deep and became the first commercially certified full ocean depth crewed submersible. Between 6 June and 26 June 2020, the DSV Limiting Factor added six crewed completed dives.

In 2019, the company moved its headquarters and Florida manufacturing facility from Vero Beach, Florida to Sebastian, Florida.

References

External links

 Company website

Manufacturing companies established in 2007
Shipbuilding companies
2007 establishments in Florida
Companies based in Florida